Gender transposition is a term in linguistics to describe the substitution of a gendered personal pronoun for the other gendered form.  When used to describe a woman, this would be using the pronouns his or him instead of her, and he instead of she.  For men, it would be the reverse.

Often used in the argot of gay men, it can be intended either as a put-down, a self-mocking appellation, a term of endearment, or neutrally.  It may be considered gay bashing or homophobic when used by heterosexual people to mock a gay person.

See also
Gay slang
Polari

LGBT slang
LGBT terminology